The Human Rights Record of the United States (informally referred to as the "China Human Rights Report") is a publication on the annual human rights record in the United States of America, published by the Information Office of the State Council of the People's Republic of China. The report was first issued in 1998 as a response to the United States' practice of criticizing China in its own annual Country Reports on Human Rights Practices, which each of the Chinese reports cites in the first paragraph.

Overview
The Human Rights Record of the United States is published annually as a retort to U.S. criticism of China's human rights policies in the annual Country Reports on Human Rights Practices, published by the State Department of the United States. The inaugural Chinese report stated that the State Department reports are "full of distortions and accusations of the human rights situation in more than 190 countries and regions including China. However, the United States turned a blind eye to its own terrible human rights situation and seldom mentioned it." It said that the United States uses the human rights issues as "a political instrument to defame other nations' image and seek its own strategic interests." The report asserted "[The U.S. State Department] released the 'Country Reports on Human Rights Practices' year after year to accuse and blame other countries for their human rights practices. These moves fully expose the United States hypocrisy by exercising double standards on human rights and its malicious design to pursue hegemony under the pretext of human rights." Subsequent reports have continued to levy similar criticisms against the U.S. report.

The Chinese reports typically criticize U.S. domestic social and economic issues, such as poverty, crime and racism. Some of the data cited in the reports is derived from official or authoritative sources; other sections are composed from a variety of material found online, some of which may be anecdotal.

Regarding the 2010 report, Fareed Zakaria wrote: "The report loses itself and takes away from the more serious charges it does make about Guantánamo Bay and CIA detention facilities. The Chinese government should get the report done by serious Chinese scholars, of whom there are many, rather than the propaganda department of its Communist Party, which seems to have written this one."

See also
 History of human rights
 Human rights
 Human rights in the People's Republic of China
 Human rights in the United States
 National Human Rights Action Plan
 Political hypocrisy

References

External links
 "China Releases Annual Human Rights Report", 
 Reuters, "China hits back on human rights", CNN
 Human Rights Records in the United States 1998 

China–United States relations
Human rights in the United States